Woodhams is a surname. Notable people with the surname include:

Edwin Woodhams (1880–1933), English cricketer
Grant Woodhams (born 1952), Australian politician
Richard Woodhams (born 1949), American classical oboist
Stephen Woodhams (born  1964), English gardener

See also
Woodham (disambiguation)